Thomas McCorkle Warlick (1888 – February 28, 1939) was an American college football player and coach. He served as the head football coach at Lenoir–Rhyne College from 1907 to 1908 and Catawba College from 1909 to 1911 and again in 1922.

References

External links
 

1888 births
1939 deaths
Catawba Indians football coaches
Davidson Wildcats football players
Lenoir–Rhyne Bears football coaches